Hussein Abdikarim Mohamed (born 20 March 1997) is a Somali footballer who plays as a winger for the Somalia national team.

International career
Mohamed represented the Somalia national team in a 3–2 2022 FIFA World Cup qualification loss to Zimbabwe on 10 September 2019.

Personal life
He holds Finnish citizenship.

References

External links
 
 

1997 births
Living people
Association football midfielders
Somalian footballers
Sportspeople from Mogadishu
Somalia international footballers
Somalian emigrants to Finland
Naturalized citizens of Finland
Finnish footballers
Finnish people of Somali descent
Veikkausliiga players
Kakkonen players
Ykkönen players
HIFK Fotboll players
FC Viikingit players
Klubi 04 players
AC Kajaani players
FC Haka players